Simon de Lanfranchi (born 23 December 1898) was a French wrestler. He competed in the men's Greco-Roman heavyweight at the 1928 Summer Olympics.

References

External links
 

1898 births
Year of death missing
French male sport wrestlers
Olympic wrestlers of France
Wrestlers at the 1928 Summer Olympics